Kenneth Kay Gardner (born September 27, 1949 in Ogden, Utah) is a retired American basketball player.  He is best known for playing for the now-defunct French club AS Berck, with which he won the French National Championship in 1973 and 1974.  Gardner went on to play for the also defunct Nice BC of the LNB (French National Basketball League) and the Utah Stars of the ABA.  Gardner was twice named the best American player in France during his five-year career there, during which he averaged 22.8 points per game. His 6,012 career points still rank in the top 100 among all-time scorers in the French league.  

Gardner played for the University of Utah in college and ranks top ten in points per game and top five in rebounds per game in the school's history.  Gardner was one of only two unanimous selections to the Western Athletic Conference all-conference basketball team in 1971.  Gardner was also 2nd Team all-conference as a Junior in 1970.  He was named the Most Valuable Player of the 1970 Utah Classic after leading the Utes with 25 points and 20 rebounds in a win over the University of Washington in the championship game.

References

1949 births
Living people
American expatriate basketball people in France
American men's basketball players
Basketball players from Utah
Phoenix Suns draft picks
Sportspeople from Ogden, Utah
Utah Stars players
Utah Utes men's basketball players